Thomas Crawford (born July 25, 1952) is a former member of the Wisconsin State Assembly.

Biography
Crawford was born Thomas James Crawford on July 25, 1952 in Kenosha, Wisconsin. He graduated from Tremper High School, as well as the University of Wisconsin–Milwaukee and the University of Wisconsin–Madison.

Career
Crawford was elected to the Assembly as a Democrat in 1980. He was re-elected in 1982 and 1984.

References

Politicians from Kenosha, Wisconsin
University of Wisconsin–Milwaukee alumni
University of Wisconsin–Madison alumni
1952 births
Living people
Democratic Party members of the Wisconsin State Assembly